Paul Penhoët (born 28 December 2001) is a French road cyclist, who currently rides for UCI WorldTeam .

Career
In 2022 he rode for UCI WorldTeam  as part of a development scheme to allow younger riders to race with the UCI WorldTour team, as the nominated team sprinter at the 2022 Tour of Oman he managed 3 top 10 results.

Major results
2019
 6th Bernaudeau Junior
 6th La Route des Géants
 9th Road race, UEC European Junior Road Championships
2021
 1st  Overall Tour d'Eure-et-Loir
1st  Points classification
1st  Young rider classification
1st Stage 3
 1st Stage 3 L'Étoile d'Or
 8th Road race, UCI Road World Under-23 Championships
2022
 1st  Road race, Mediterranean Games
 2nd Youngster Coast Challenge
 3rd Overall Tour de Normandie
1st  Points classification
1st Stage 5 
 5th Dorpenomloop Rucphen
 6th Grand Prix de la Ville de Lillers
 8th Road race, UCI Road World Under-23 Championships
2023
 4th Classic Loire Atlantique
 9th Clásica de Almería

References

External links

2001 births
Living people
French male cyclists
Mediterranean Games gold medalists for France
Competitors at the 2022 Mediterranean Games